Gobius fallax, or Sarato's goby, is a species of goby native to the Mediterranean Sea where it is found in inshore waters in locations with rocks and crevices for shelter at depths of from .  This species can reach a length of  TL. There is a single record from the Canary Islands.

References

Fish of the Atlantic Ocean
Fish of the Mediterranean Sea
Fish of Europe
Gobius
Fish described in 1889